The Clayton H. Delano House is a historic house located at 25 Father Jogues Place in Ticonderoga, Essex County, New York.

Description and history 
The home was built in 1857 in the Italianate style, and was remodeled and enlarged between 1884 and 1891 in the Queen Anne style. It is an irregularly massed, -story, slate-roofed clapboard-sheathed house with a 3-story square tower with a pyramidal hipped roof. It has a -story shed-roofed wing. A sunflower motif appears on the exterior and interior. Also on the property is a carriage barn built in about 1890.

It was listed on the National Register of Historic Places on November 15, 1988.

References

Houses on the National Register of Historic Places in New York (state)
Queen Anne architecture in New York (state)
Houses completed in 1857
Houses in Essex County, New York
National Register of Historic Places in Essex County, New York
1857 establishments in New York (state)